Stefan Glowacz (born March 22, 1965 in Tittmoning) is a German professional rock climber and adventurer. He started climbing at the age of 12 and advanced to one of the world's best sports climbers only few years later. Since 1993 he has been devoted to natural challenges such as expeditions to remote places in Canada, Patagonia and Antarctica.

Success in sport climbing 
 1985 Sportroccia
 1987, 1988, 1992 Rock Master
 Winner of the Olympic Games' demonstration challenge in Albertville
 1993 Vice World Champion

Notable ascents 
 In 1994, Glowacz freed  (translated: The Emperor's new Clothes) in the Kaiser Mountains at (X+/8b+/5.14a), one of the hardest-ever big wall climbing routes in world. 
 First ascents of big walls at the Una Peaks (Cape Renard Towers) in Antarctica; Tupilak and Ulamartorsuaq, respectively in Eastern and Southern Greenland; and Mount Harrison Smith in Canada
 In 2001, Glowacz became the first-ever person to complete the "" of the hardest multi-pitch big wall climbing routes of the Alps (all established in 1994), including Thomas Huber's "End of Silence" (X/8b/5.13d) near Berchtesgaden and Beat Kammerlander's "Silbergeier" ("Silver Vulture") (X/8b/5.13d) in the Rätikon
 In 2006, he was nominated for the Piolet d'Or' for a 27-pitch route (IX+/7c+/5.13a, A2, M4) up the north wall of the Mullarón in Patagonia.

Books, Films 
 Jäger des Augenblicks
 Richtig Freiklettern
 Rocks around the World
 Hoch hinaus
 Titlis – Chronik einer Erstbegehung, DVD
 The Race, DVD
 On the Rocks - Leben an den Fingerspitzen (2005, Piper)
 Cerro Torre: Scream of the Stone (1991, directed by Werner Herzog), DVD
 Roraima: Climbers of the Lost World (2013, Red Bull)

See also 
History of rock climbing
List of first ascents (sport climbing)

References

External links 
 
 Biography on climbandmore.com

1965 births
Living people
German rock climbers
People from Traunstein (district)
Sportspeople from Upper Bavaria
IFSC Climbing World Championships medalists